The Ohio State Penitentiary (OSP) is a 502-inmate capacity supermax Ohio Department of Rehabilitation and Correction prison in Youngstown, Ohio.

Throughout the last two centuries, there have been two institutions with the name Ohio Penitentiary or Ohio State Penitentiary; the first prison was in Columbus, Ohio.

Inmates in Levels 5B and 5A are classified as those who fail to adapt or those who are active participants/ring leaders of security threat groups.

Level 4 inmates occupy similarly-designed cells but have additional freedom to move about within specific cell blocks. Inmates classified as Level 4B may also exercise within their specific cell block, but are also required to lock down before security staff enter the cell block to perform range checks, serve food, etc. Inmates classified as Level 4A are not subject to this restriction.

Formerly, the majority of Ohio's death row inmates were held at OSP. In January 2012, the majority of death row inmates were transferred to the Chillicothe Correctional Institution. OSP does retain death row cells for inmates who are considered the highest security risk. As of 2019, six high security death row inmates remain at OSP, four of whom were involved in the 1993 Lucasville prison riot at the Southern Ohio Correctional Facility.

Ohio State Penitentiary currently holds level 5, 4, 3 and 1 inmates. Level 1 inmates are housed outside of the institutional fence in their own building. Inmates placed in restricted housing for disciplinary rules infractions are locked down with the exception of showers, restrooms, and one recreation period of one hour, 5 days per week.

Original prison 

The original Ohio Penitentiary was located in Columbus, Ohio. It was demolished in 1998 to make way for the Arena District. During its time of operation, the penitentiary hosted many notable prisoners including James H. Snook and the novelist O. Henry. During the American Civil War, the prison housed members of John Hunt Morgan's Confederate cavalry, who had been detained following Morgan's Raid. Morgan and several of his men successfully escaped captivity and returned to the South.

2011 hunger strike 
In January 2011, three men on Ohio's Death Row, Keith LaMar, Jason Robb and Carlos Sanders, held a twelve-day long hunger strike. The reason for the strike was that they were not receiving equal treatment and privileges as the other death row prisoners, which LaMar, Robb and Sanders believed was because they were placed on death row due to their involvement in the 1993 Lucasville prison riot at the Southern Ohio Correctional Facility. The prisoners drew influence for their strike from the 1981 Irish Hunger Strike, which lasted for 53 days. The prisoners' requests were that they wanted more time out of their cells, access to sunlight, access to more food and warm-weather clothing through commissary. They also requested semi-contact visits and access to news and legal databases in order to help their attorneys file appeals to their sentences, all privileges that were accessible to the other death row inmates.

Throughout the strike the three men met with the Warden to negotiate a signed agreement to their demands, which they received on January 14, 2011. Robb ended his hunger strike the same day they received the agreement, however LaMar and Sanders did not end their strike until the following day, when they also received a letter of support for the strike containing 1,200 signatures from around the world.

Notable inmates 
 Brian Golsby (since 2018) - Kidnapped, raped, and murdered Reagan Tokes in 2017.
 T.J. Lane (from 2014 to 2016) - Perpetrator of the Chardon High School shooting. Transferred here after escaping from Allen Correctional Institution. Has since been moved to Warren Correctional Institution.

References

External links 

  Ohio State Penitentiary
  Ohio Death Row Inmates

Prisons in Ohio
Buildings and structures in Youngstown, Ohio
Supermax prisons
Capital punishment in Ohio
1998 establishments in Ohio